Petey (or 3CS-3) was a satellite, part of Three Corner Satellite (3CS) project, a three satellite (Sparkie, Ralphie and Petey) student research project. It was designed and built by mostly undergraduate students at the New Mexico State University as part of the Air Force Research Laboratory's University Nanosat Program. It was responsible for communication system in 3CS project.

Satellite was not completed in time for launch of 3CS on December 21, 2004, and later was donated to the National Air and Space Museum’s Steven F. Udvar-Hazy Center. The two other 3CS satellites Sparkie and Ralphie were launched 21 December 2004 on the first launch of Delta IV Heavy. The launch was a partial failure, and in particular the two 3CS satellites did not achieve orbit.

Satellite carries name of New Mexico State University's mascot, Pistol Pete.

See also 
 Ralphie (satellite)
 Sparkie (satellite)

References

External links 
Archived homepage of project

2004 in spaceflight